Don't Forget About Me, Demos is the debut EP by American singer and rapper Dominic Fike, released on October 16, 2018 through Columbia.

Background
Most of the songs that appear on the EP were recorded in late 2017 while Fike was on house arrest for battery of a police officer and were released independently through SoundCloud. In 2018, while serving a short jail sentence for breaking the terms of his house arrest, Fike's music generated a substantial amount of interest and sparked a bidding war amongst record labels. During this time all of his independently released music was removed from streaming services. On August 3, it was announced he had signed with Columbia Records for a reported $3-4 million. On October 16, he officially released Don't Forget About Me, Demos as his major-label debut.

Track listing
All songs written and produced by Dominic Fike, unless otherwise noted.

References

2018 debut EPs
Dominic Fike EPs
Columbia Records EPs
Pop music EPs